Naujoji Vilnia is a toponym that might refer to:

 Naujoji Vilnia, a district in Vilnius, Lithuania
 Naujoji Vilnia railway station, a station of the Lithuanian Railways
 Naujoji Vilnia yard, a depot serving electric trains of Lithuanian Railways